Portrait of the Painter Claude Monet is an 1875 oil on canvas portrait of Claude Monet by Pierre-Auguste Renoir. It is exhibited in the Musée d'Orsay in Paris.

See also
 The Improvised Field Hospital, 1865 painting by Frédéric Bazille
 A Studio at Les Batignolles, 1870 painting by Henri Fantin-Latour
 Claude Monet Painting in His Garden at Argenteuil, 1873 painting by Renoir 
 Claude Monet Painting in his Studio, 1874 painting by Édouard Manet

References

External links
Description at the Musée d'Orsay.

Paintings by Pierre-Auguste Renoir
1875 paintings
Paintings about painting
Paintings in the collection of the Musée d'Orsay
Cultural depictions of Claude Monet